Alioune Badara Faty (born 3 May 1999) is a Senegalese professional footballer who plays as a goalkeeper for Casa Sports. Faty represents the Senegal national team.

Honours
Senegal
Africa Cup of Nations: 2021

References

External links
 

Living people
1999 births
Senegalese footballers
Association football goalkeepers
Africa Cup of Nations-winning players
2021 Africa Cup of Nations
Casa Sports players
Senegal international footballers
Senegal A' international footballers
2022 African Nations Championship players
People from Ziguinchor